Grayson is a surname that is most probably either an anglicization of the Scottish or Irish clan surnames Grierson or Gray; alternatively, it can also be found in Northern England as a derivative of the English surname Gravesson, meaning "son of the reeve". It has been postulated as a Clan Gregor alias, but there is little surviving information to support this claim.

Notable people with the surname "Grayson" include

A
Alan Grayson (born 1958), American politician
Andrew J. Grayson (1819–1869), American ornithologist and artist

B
Bette Grayson (1920–1954), American actress
Bobby Grayson (1914–1981), American football player
Bradley Grayson (born 1994), English footballer

C
Campbell Grayson (born 1986), New Zealand squash player
Cary T. Grayson (1878–1938), American surgeon
Cecil Grayson (1920–1998), English scholar
Charles Grayson (disambiguation), multiple people
C. Jackson Grayson (1923–2017), American businessman
Clifford Prevost Grayson (1857–1951), American painter
Coco Grayson (born 2000), American actress
Cyril Grayson (born 1993), American football player

D
Dan Grayson (1967–2021), American football player
Dave Grayson (1939–2017), American football player
David Grayson (disambiguation), multiple people
Devin Grayson, American comic book writer
Diane Grayson (born 1948), English actress

E
Ethel Grayson (1890–1980), Canadian writer

F
Frances Wilson Grayson (1892–1927), American aviator
Francis Grayson (1849–1927), Australian shopkeeper

G
G. B. Grayson (1887–1930), American musician
Garrett Grayson (born 1991), American football player
George Grayson (disambiguation), multiple people
Godfrey Grayson (1913–1998), English film director

H
Harry Grayson (1894–1968), American sportswriter
Henry Grayson (1865–1951), English shipbuilder
Henry Joseph Grayson (1856–1918), English scientist

J
Jack Grayson, American musician
James Grayson (born 1998), English rugby union footballer
James H. Grayson (born 1944), American scholar
Jeff Grayson (disambiguation), multiple people
Jerry Grayson (born 1955), British naval pilot
Jessie Coles Grayson (1886–1953), American actress
Joe Grayson (born 1999), English footballer
John Grayson (disambiguation), multiple people

K
Kathryn Grayson (1922–2010), American singer and actress

L
Larry Grayson (1923–1995), British television personality
Lawrence Grayson (1839–1916), Australian politician
Lisa Grayson (born 1972), British gymnast

N
Neil Grayson (born 1964), English footballer

P
Paul Grayson (disambiguation), multiple people
Peter W. Grayson (1788–1838), American attorney and diplomat

R
Ralph Grayson (1921–1991), American scientist and engineer
Richard Grayson (disambiguation), multiple people
Robert Grayson (disambiguation), multiple people

S
Simon Grayson (born 1969), British footballer
Stu Grayson (born 1989), Canadian professional wrestler
Stuart Grayson (1923–2001), American minister

T
Tim Grayson (born 1967), American politician
Trey Grayson (born 1972), American politician

V
Vaughan Grayson (1894–1995), Canadian artist
Victor Grayson (1881–1920), British politician
Virginia Grayson (born 1967), New Zealand-Australian artist

W
Wayne Grayson (born 1974), American voice actor
William Grayson (disambiguation), multiple people

Fictional characters
 Carter Grayson, a character on the television series Power Rangers Lightspeed Rescue.
Charlotte Grayson, a character on the television show Revenge
Conrad Grayson, a character on the television show Revenge
Dick Grayson (disambiguation), multiple fictional character
Jayne Grayson, a character on the television show Holby City
Victoria Grayson, a character on the television show Revenge

See also
Grayson (given name), a page for people with the given name "Grayson"
Grayson (disambiguation), a disambiguation page for "Grayson"
Greyson, a page for "Grayson"

References